Georges Stuber (11 May 1925 – 16 April 2006) was a Swiss football goalkeeper who played for Switzerland in the 1950 and 1954 FIFA World Cup. He also played for FC Luzern, FC Lausanne-Sport, and Servette FC.

References

External links
FIFA profile

1925 births
2006 deaths
People from Zug
Sportspeople from the canton of Zug
Swiss men's footballers
Switzerland international footballers
Association football goalkeepers
FC Luzern players
FC Lausanne-Sport players
Servette FC players
1950 FIFA World Cup players
1954 FIFA World Cup players
Swiss Super League players